The East–West Corridor is the built-up area of north Trinidad stretching from the capital, Port of Spain,  east to Arima.  The term was coined by economist and political philosopher Lloyd Best, after gleaning the works of a technocrat named Lynette Attwell.  The Corridor includes such towns as Laventille, Morvant,  Barataria, San Juan, St. Joseph, Curepe, St. Augustine, Tunapuna, Tacarigua, Arouca, and Five Rivers, once distinct communities, now districts within a continuous urban area. For the most part it runs along the Eastern Main Road, between the Churchill–Roosevelt Highway and the foothills of the Northern Range. It is a densely populated and fairly congested strip of development along some of the best agricultural soils in the country.

Gallery

References

Metropolitan areas of Trinidad and Tobago
Trinidad (island)